The North Gippsland Football League (NGFL) is an Australian rules football league in the Central Gippsland area of Victoria, Australia.

History

The NGFL was formed in 1955 through the merger of the Cowwarr Football League and the Sale District Football League.

The league was known as the Sale Cowwarr FL, until taking its present name in 1965. The region where the league is located is home to a number of other Australian football leagues, and a number of clubs have shifted between the North Gippsland FL and others such as the Mid Gippsland Football League, Riviera Football League and Latrobe Valley Football League.

In 2008, the league gained the Woodside and District Wildcats, who broke away from the DWWWW club in the Alberton Football League, followed in 2014 by Yarram. In 2012 Stratford, followed by Boisdale-Briagolong in 2015 moved to the weaker East Gippsland Football League.

Games in the North Gippsland Football League are umpired by members of the Sale Umpires Association.

Clubs

Current clubs

Former

Premiers

Leading Goal Kickers

2007 Ladder

2008 Ladder

2009 Ladder

2010 Ladder

2011 Ladder

2012 Ladder

2013 Ladder

2014 Ladder

2015 Ladder

2016 Ladder

2017 Ladder

2018 Ladder

2019 Ladder

References

External links
Official North Gippsland Football League website

Australian rules football competitions in Victoria (Australia)
Gippsland (region)